Carzano (Carthàn or Carzàn in local dialect) is a comune (municipality) in Trentino in the northern Italian region Trentino-Alto Adige/Südtirol, located about  east of Trento.

Carzano borders the following municipalities: Telve, Scurelle, and Castelnuovo.

Demographic evolution

References

Cities and towns in Trentino-Alto Adige/Südtirol